The Costa Book Award for Biography, formerly part of the Whitbread Book Awards (1971-2006), was an annual literary award for children's books, part of the Costa Book Awards. The award concluded in 2022.

Recipients 
Costa Books of the Year are distinguished wit a blue ribbon. Costa Book Award for Biography winners are distinguished with bold.

See also 

 Costa Book Award for Children's Books
 Costa Book Award for First Novel
 Costa Book Award for Novel
 Costa Book Award for Poetry
 Costa Book Award for Short Story
 Costa Book Awards

References

External links 

 Official website

Awards established in 1971
Awards disestablished in 2022
English-language literary awards
Costa Book Awards